The Men's 400 metre freestyle competition at the 2019 World Championships was held on 21 July 2019. The three-time defending champion was Sun Yang, and he successfully defended his title for a record-breaking 4th consecutive victory in the world championships in this event. He became the third man to win an event 4 times at the world championships after Grant Hackett in the 1500 meter freestyle and Ryan Lochte in the 200 meter individual medley.

Records
Prior to the competition, the existing world and championship records were as follows.

Results

Heats
The heats were held at 10:16.

Final
The final was held at 20:02.

References

Men's 400 metre freestyle